David Ryrie (16 August 1829 – 13 July 1893) was an Australian politician.

He was born in Sydney to pastoralist Stewart Ryrie and Isabella Cassels. A pastoralist himself, he ran a number of properties with his brother Alexander. On 8 November 1865 he married Ellen Eliza Faunce, with whom he had eleven children. He was elected to the New South Wales Legislative Assembly for Monaro in an 1884 by-election, but did not re-contest the general election the following year. Ryrie died in Sydney in 1893.

See also 

 Stewart Ryrie, his father
 Alexander Ryrie, his brother
 William Ryrie, his half brother.

References

 

1829 births
1893 deaths
Members of the New South Wales Legislative Assembly
19th-century Australian politicians
Settlers of New South Wales